Emmen Zuid is a railway station located in Emmen, Netherlands, on the Zwolle–Emmen railway. The services are operated by Arriva. There is a tunnel under the railway line for the road and cycle path. Near the station is a car park and bus station. The station opened on 3 April 2011 and replaced Emmen Bargeres railway station. Construction work for the station began in March 2010. Formerly, there was a level crossing at the station location.

Train services

Bus services
Since 2018, there is no regular bus service anymore at this station, but the Hubtaxi (a small taxi bus that operates if called one hour in advance) does serve the station.

See also
 List of railway stations in Drenthe

External links
NS website 
Dutch Public Transport journey planner 

Railway stations in Drenthe
Railway stations opened in 2010
Railway stations on the Emmerlijn
Buildings and structures in Emmen, Netherlands